William Debenham (18 April 1794 – 24 September 1863) was the founder of Debenhams, once one of the largest retailers in the United Kingdom.

Career
Born in 1794 in Alpheton in Suffolk, William Debenham joined Thomas Clark in a partnership to manage a draper's store at 44 Wigmore Street in London.

The partners later expanded the business such that it had stores on both sides of Wigmore Street, one known as Debenham & Clark and the other known as Clark & Debenham. When William Debenham Snr retired a new partnership was formed between his son, William Debenham Jnr, and Clement Freebody. This business became Debenhams, one of the largest retailers in the United Kingdom. William Debenham Snr died in 1863 at Kensal Rise in London.

Family
William married Caroline Freebody in 1820 and together they had six sons and four daughters.

References

Further reading
 Fine Silks and Oak Counters 1778 – 1978 by Maurice Corina, Published 1978, Hutchinson Benham 

1794 births
1863 deaths
19th-century British businesspeople
British retail company founders
William